Wayne W. Bayless (1895-1975) (less commonly known as Wayne Winton Bayless) was an attorney and politician from Claremore, Oklahoma who served as a justice on the Oklahoma Supreme Court between 1932 and 1948. A member of the Democratic party, he had served previously in the Oklahoma House of Representatives, a candidate for the U.S. House of Representatives in 1924 and as a District Judge in 1926–1929.

Wayne W. Bayless was born to John Melville Bayless (1851-1907) and Mary (née Stubblefield) (1856-1928) on August 27, 1895 in Cassville, Missouri. In 1907, Wayne and his family moved to Oklahoma, where they settled in Claremore. He attended the Oklahoma University School of Law, where he earned the LL.B., then was admitted to the Oklahoma Bar in 1920.

Bayless was elected as a member of the 9th Oklahoma Legislature in 1932.  In 1924, he received the Democratic nomination for Representative to the U.S. Congress. Although he lost in the general election, the margin was only 143 votes out of 93,000 cast.

He was elected Judge of the 2nd Judicial District in 1926, then was re-elected to that position in 1930. He was named an associate justice of the Oklahoma Supreme Court in 1932, then retained his seat in the 1936 election. He had announced that he would run for reelection again in 1948.

Bayless died December 17, 1975 at the age of 80. He was interred in Woodlawn Cemetery at Claremore.

Notes

References

External links 
 www.example.com

1895 births
1975 deaths
University of Oklahoma College of Law alumni
People from Claremore, Oklahoma
Justices of the Oklahoma Supreme Court
20th-century American judges